The following lists events that happened during 1870 in South Africa.

Incumbents
 Governor of the Cape of Good Hope and High Commissioner for Southern Africa:
 Sir Philip Wodehouse (until 19 May).
 Charles Craufurd Hay (acting from 20 May to 30 December).
 Sir Henry Barkly (from 31 December).
 Lieutenant-governor of the Colony of Natal: Robert William Keate.
 State President of the Orange Free State: Jan Brand.
 State President of the South African Republic: Marthinus Wessel Pretorius.

Events
May
 20 – Charles Craufurd Hay becomes acting Governor of the Cape of Good Hope and High Commissioner for Southern Africa.

July
 30 – The Klipdrift Republic is proclaimed by a group of diamond miners with Stafford Parker as their president.

December
 31 – Sir Henry Barkly is appointed Governor of the Cape of Good Hope and High Commissioner for Southern Africa.

Date unknown
 The Alfred Basin in Table Bay Harbour, named after Prince Alfred, is completed.

Births
 24 May – Jan Smuts, South African soldier and statesman. (d. 1950)

Deaths
 11 March – Moshoeshoe I, King of Lesotho. (b. c. 1786)

Railways

Locomotives
 A second locomotive is at work on excavation and breakwater construction in Table Bay Harbour, a 0-4-0 saddle-tank engine believed to have been built by Hughes's Locomotive & Tramway Engine Works and delivered to the Cape at some time between 1863 and 1870.

References

South Africa
Years in South Africa
History of South Africa